Sibut is the capital of Kémo prefecture, Central African Republic.

Sibut may also refer to:

 Kampong Sibut, a village in Mukim Amo, Temburong District, Brunei
 A native name of the tree Dacryodes patentinervia

See also
 Sibutu